3rd Uchastok is a rural locality (a settlement) in Dmitrov Urban Settlement of Dmitrovsky District, Russia. The population was 0 as of 2010.

Streets 
 There are no streets with titles.

Geography 
3rd Uchastok is located 24 km south of Tulun (the district's administrative centre) by road. 4th Uchastok is the nearest rural locality.

References 

Rural localities in Dmitrovsky District, Moscow Oblast